Polozayka is a rural locality (a village) in Kochyovskoye Rural Settlement, Kochyovsky District, Perm Krai, Russia. The population was 9 as of 2010. There are 3 streets.

Geography 
Polozayka is located 24 km southeast of Kochyovo (the district's administrative centre) by road. Kukushka is the nearest rural locality.

References 

Rural localities in Kochyovsky District